The Geologists' Association, founded in 1858, is a British organisation with charitable status for those concerned with the study of geology. It publishes the Proceedings of the Geologists' Association
and jointly with the Geological Society of London, Geology Today.

See also 
 List of geoscience organizations
 List of presidents of the Geologists' Association

References

External links 
 Geologists' Association website

 
Scientific organizations established in 1858
Geology societies
Learned societies of the United Kingdom
1858 establishments in the United Kingdom
Scientific organisations based in the United Kingdom